Memledar may refer to:

Mamledar misal
Lavoo Mamledar, Indian politician